Luo Zhanglong (30 November 1896 – 3 February 1995) was a Chinese educator. He was born in Liuyang, Hunan Province. He was a member of the 3rd Central Executive Committee of the Chinese Communist Party and an alternate member of the 4th Central Executive Committee of the Chinese Communist Party.

References

Bibliography
 罗章龙回忆录，休斯敦：溪流出版社， 2005年

1896 births
1995 deaths
Alternate members of the 4th Central Executive Committee of the Chinese Communist Party
Alternate members of the 6th Central Committee of the Chinese Communist Party
Chinese Communist Party politicians from Hunan
Delegates to the 2nd National Congress of the Chinese Communist Party
Delegates to the 5th National Congress of the Chinese Communist Party
Educators from Hunan
Heads of the Publicity Department of the Chinese Communist Party
Members of the 5th Central Committee of the Chinese Communist Party
Members of the 3rd Central Executive Committee of the Chinese Communist Party
People from Liuyang
People's Republic of China politicians from Hunan
Politicians from Changsha